Khon Kaen is one of the four major cities of Isan, Thailand, also known as the "big four of Isan", the others being Udon Thani, Nakhon Ratchasima, and Ubon Ratchathani. It is the capital of Khon Kaen province and the Mueang Khon Kaen district.

Geography and demography
Khon Kaen is on the Khorat Plateau, elevation 187 m, and is the center of the mid-northeastern provincial group of Thailand, according to the Thai government. The city has a population of 114,459.

Location
Khon Kaen is a city in the northeastern region of Thailand. The city is bisected by Mithraphap Road, also known as the "Friendship Highway", or "Highway 2", the road linking Bangkok to the Thai-Lao Friendship Bridge. Highway 230, a modern, multi-lane by-pass enables through-traffic to avoid the city center to the west, and connects to the airport, the new main bus station (BKS3).

Smart City 
The province of Khon Kaen's 2017 population was 1.8 million with a GDP of 190 billion baht. Its Smart City development plan aims to double its GDP per person to 394,000-493,000 baht by 2029 from an average of about 192,000 baht in 2016. Khon Kaen's plan has been incorporated into Thailand's 12th national social and economic plan (2017-2021). The plan has been driven largely by the Khon Kaen Think Tank (KKTT), a group of involved citizens. The Smart City's signature project is the Khon Kaen Transit System Co (KKTS), founded in 2017. Its plans for a 26 km light rail network from Samran to Tha Phra in the Mueang Khon Kaen District are complete and awaiting Thai Cabinet approval before bidding on the project can begin. The light rail system will feature 18 to 21 stations, take two years to complete, and will cost 15 billion baht. The Land Traffic Management Commission (LTMC), a national think tank for transportation policy, has already blessed the plan.

Culture
Thailand's 2014 EU Film Festival included Khon Kaen, together with Chiang Mai and Bangkok, as host locations. A selection of six films was shown in the city, including the Spanish film The Pelayos and the Polish film Walesa, Man of Hope.

Administration
The municipality of Khon Kaen was established on 20 August 1935, with an area of 4 square kilometers. It was later upgraded to a city municipality on 24 September 1995. The administration of the city is now responsible for an area that covers approximately 46 sq. km. and consists of 66,179 households. There are 95 communities divided into 4 zones, each with about 20-30 communities each.

Notable people
Tee Ritson - rugby league player
Thaiboy Digital - Musician

Climate
Khon Kaen's climate is categorized as tropical savanna (Köppen climate classification Aw), with winters that are dry and very warm. The monsoon season runs from May until October, with heavy rain and somewhat cooler temperatures during the day, although nights remain warm.

References

External links
 
 Tourism Thailand official website

 
Isan
Populated places in Khon Kaen province
Cities and towns in Thailand
Smart cities